Glina is small settlement just west of Nova Vas in the Municipality of Bloke in the Inner Carniola region of Slovenia.

References

External links 

Glina on Geopedia

Populated places in the Municipality of Bloke